Harold Reed Devoll (September 29, 1923 – January 12, 2010) was an American professional basketball player. He played in the National Basketball League for the Detroit Vagabond Kings and Hammond Calumet Buccaneers during the 1948–49 season and averaged 4.6 points per game.

References 

1923 births
2010 deaths
American men's basketball players
Basketball players from Detroit
Centers (basketball)
Detroit Vagabond Kings players
Forwards (basketball)
Hammond Calumet Buccaneers players
Lawrence Tech Blue Devils men's basketball players